The 2009 Florida Tuskers season was the first season for the Florida Tuskers. In the UFL's Premiere Season, the Tuskers put together a league-best, undefeated 6–0 record. In the championship game however, they lost to the Las Vegas Locomotives in overtime.

The Tuskers played three home games in the six game regular season. Two games were played at the Citrus Bowl in Orlando, and one was played at Tropicana Field in St. Petersburg.

Following the conclusion of the season, quarterback Brooks Bollinger was named season MVP, and head coach Jim Haslett was given the Coach of the Year award.

Prior to season
Jim Haslett, former NFL head coach of the New Orleans Saints and St. Louis Rams, was named head coach of the then unnamed franchise, on March 11, 2009.

The team name, uniforms, and colors were unveiled on August 12, 2009. On the same day it was announced that the Tampa Bay Rays had bought interest in the team.

Draft

The draft took place on June 19, 2009. Those selected were among participants in earlier workouts held in Orlando as well as Las Vegas. Once a player was picked by a team, his rights were held by that team should he elect to play in the UFL. With their first selection, the Tuskers picked former Arkansas nose tackle Fred Bledsoe.

Personnel

Staff

Roster

Schedule

Regular season

Championship Game

Standings

Game summaries

Week 1: vs. New York Sentinels

The Tuskers opened the season with a convincing 35–13 win over the New York Sentinels. Quarterback Brooks Bollinger threw for 225 yards and four touchdowns.

Week 2: at Las Vegas Locomotives

On the road, Bollinger would surpass his total from a week before with 310 yards. Through the first three quarters, the Tuskers had kept the Las Vegas Locomotives from scoring, and led by 22 points. Kicker Matt Bryant connected on three field goals in the game, won by the Tuskers 29–15. With the win, the Tuskers moved into first place by themselves.

Week 3: vs. California Redwoods

Back in Orlando for Week 3, the Tuskers routed the California Redwoods 34–7, and improved to 3–0 on the season. The Tusker defense held the Redwoods to only 196 yards and forced five turnovers, including four interceptions. Taye Biddle was the Tuskers' leading receiver with 133 yards on five receptions, however no touchdowns.

Week 4: vs. Las Vegas Locomotives

The Tuskers traveled to their secondary home stadium for Week 4, Tropicana Field, normally known as the home to the Tampa Bay Rays of Major League Baseball. The Tuskers hosted the Locomotives, who were coming off of their bye week and facing the Tuskers in their second consecutive game. In contrast to the teams' previous game, the game was tied at 24–24 late in the 4th quarter. Matt Bryant nailed a 40-yard field goal to give the Tuskers the lead with 4:38 to play. Las Vegas would get the ball back with just under two minutes left, but Florida's defense held strong and the Tuskers remained undefeated with their fourth win of the season. With the victory, the Tuskers clinched a spot in the 2009 UFL Championship Game.

Week 6: at New York Sentinels

Coming off of their bye week, the Tuskers were on the road against the Sentinels in Week 6. The game was close in the 1st half, with the Tuskers holding a slight 10–6 lead at halftime. However, the Tuskers defense kept New York out of the end zone the entire night. Also behind Brooks Bollinger's arm, throwing for 215 yards and two touchdowns, the Tuskers won 24–6, keeping the undefeated season alive at 5–0.

Week 7: at California Redwoods

In Week 7, the Tuskers played their final game of the regular season in California. After both of the Tuskers' first two scores in the first quarter, they boldly attempted an onside kick and successfully recovered both. In the 1st quarter, both teams traded a field goal and a touchdown, but the Tuskers were down at halftime 24–20. After that, the Tuskers defense stood tall as they had in the previous week, only allowing a 3rd-quarter field goal in the entire 2nd half. Still down 27–20, Brooks Bollinger put together a 67-yard drive capped off by a touchdown pass to Jayson Foster on the first play of the 4th quarter. Foster was drilled by a Redwoods defensive player immediately after making the catch, but Foster held on to the ball for the score to tie the game. Later in the 4th quarter, California moved the ball to the Tuskers' 33-yard line, but cornerback Darius Vinnett intercepted the ball for the Tuskers and returned it 58 yards to the Redwoods' 8-yard line. A few plays later, running back Michael Pittman dove over the goal line for the touchdown, putting the Tuskers ahead 34–27. The Redwoods would punt the ball back to Florida on the ensuing drive, and with a chance to ice the game on 3rd down with only a yard needed for the 1st down, Pittman fumbled, and California came up with the ball. However, the Redwoods were unable to capitalize on the turnover, as Josh Cooper recovered his own forced fumble on Redwoods quarterback Shane Boyd, sealing the win for the Tuskers. The game was considered as one of the most entertaining of the season. The Tuskers remained undefeated at the conclusion of the regular season, finishing with a 6–0 record going into the championship game against Las Vegas.

Championship Game

Though it was announced as the location of the championship game before the two teams clinched a spot, the Tuskers traveled back to Las Vegas to play the Locomotives at Sam Boyd Stadium, attempting to beat them for the third time in the season. It was a defensive battle through the first three quarters, until both teams' offenses came alive in the fourth quarter. Tied with 17 points each at the end of regulation, the game went to overtime, the first overtime game in league history. The Tuskers won the coin toss and received the ball first in OT, but Brooks Bollinger threw an interception deep in Tuskers territory. The Locos ran one play to line the ball in between the goal posts, and kicker Graham Gano made the game-winning field goal just inside the right upright to win the championship for Las Vegas, and end the Tuskers' chance at a perfect season.

References

Florida Tuskers Season, 2009
Florida Tuskers seasons
Florida Tuskers